The Biblioteca Nacional Pedro Henríquez Ureña (in English: Pedro Henríquez Ureña National Library) is the national library of the Dominican Republic. It is the legal deposit and copyright library for the Dominican Republic. It was inaugurated on February 28, 1971.

See also 
 List of national libraries

External links 
 Official site 
 Library's Blog 
 Archivo General de la Nación, "Sitios relacionados" (related sites) 
 Dominicana Online, Bibliographical Sources 

1971 establishments in the Dominican Republic
Dominican Republic culture
Government of the Dominican Republic
Libraries in the Dominican Republic
Dominican Republic
Libraries established in 1971
Buildings and structures in Santo Domingo